List of Ireland national rugby union players is a list of men who have played for the Ireland national rugby union team.

Note the list only includes men who have played in a Test match (which includes those who played against the 1888–89 New Zealand Native football team)
 Those who represented the British and Irish Lions but were never capped for Ireland are not included - for example William Joseph Ashby was part of the first Lions team to tour South Africa in 1910 but was never capped for Ireland.
 Those who represented Ireland in matches where no caps were awarded are not included - for example James Myles represented Ireland during the 1899 Ireland rugby union tour of Canada but was never capped for Ireland.

 denotes players currently active at national level. As of 3 February 2023, 1,141 men have represented Ireland.

References

External links
Ireland Players at IRFU
List of Ireland national rugby union players at ESPN

Ireland international rugby union players
Ireland
Rugby union
players